Michael Doeberl (15 January 1861, Waldsassen – 24 March 1928, Partenkirchen) was a German historian who specialized in Bavarian history.

He studied philology and history at the University of Munich, obtaining his doctorate from the University of Erlangen in 1887. In 1894 he received his habilitation and in 1905 became an honorary professor. From 1917 to 1928 he held the chair of Bavarian history at the University of Munich.

He was the founding chairman of the Gründungsvorsitzenden der Kommission für bayerische Landesgeschichte (Commission for Bavarian Regional History). The Michael Doeberl Preis is an annual award issued by the Institut für Bayerische Geschichte.

Selected works 
 Bayern und Frankreich vornehmlich unter Kurfürst Ferdinand Maria. 2 volumes, München 1900–1903 – Bavaria and France: mainly under Ferdinand Maria, Elector of Bavaria.
 Entwicklungsgeschichte Bayerns, (Historical development of Bavaria) 3 volumes; R. Oldenbourg, München 1906–1931.
 Band 1, Von den ältesten Zeiten bis zum Westfälischen Frieden. 1906 – From the earliest times up to the Peace of Westphalia.
 Band 2, Vom Westfälischen Frieden bis zum Tode König Maximilians I, (1. u. 2. Aufl.) 1912 – The Peace of Westphalia up until the death of King Maximilian I of Bavaria. 
 Band 3, Vom Regierungsantritt König Ludwigs I. bis zum Tode König Ludwigs II. mit einem Ausblick auf die innere Entwicklung Bayerns unter dem Prinzregenten Luitpold, (edition by Max Spindler) – From the accession of King Ludwig I of Bavaria to the death of King Ludwig II; with a view on the inner development of Bavaria under Prince Regent Luitpold of Bavaria.
 Bayern und Deutschland, (Bavaria and Germany) 3 volumes; München und Berlin 1922–1926. 
 Band 1, Bayern und die deutsche Frage in der Epoche des Frankfurter Parlaments. – Bavaria and the German question during the era of the Frankfurt Parliament.
 Band 2, Bayern und die Bismarckische Reichsgründung. 1925 – Bavaria and the Bismarckian founding of the Reich.
 Band 3, Bayern und das preußische Unionsprojekt – Bavaria and the Prussian Union project.
 König Ludwig I. der zweite gründer der Ludwig-Maximilians-universität, 1926 – King Ludwig I, the second founder of Ludwig-Maximilian University.

References

External links
 

1861 births
1928 deaths
Ludwig Maximilian University of Munich alumni
Academic staff of the Ludwig Maximilian University of Munich
20th-century German historians
People from Tirschenreuth (district)
19th-century German historians